Olivier Bellavance-Roy (born July 12, 1991) is a Canadian professional ice hockey goaltender currently playing for Fehérvár AV19 of the ICE Hockey League (ICEHL).

Roy was originally drafted in the fifth round, 133rd overall, in the 2009 NHL Entry Draft by the Edmonton Oilers. His playing style is modeled after several players, including Marc-André Fleury and Rick DiPietro. He is of no relation to former NHL goaltender and head coach Patrick Roy.

Playing career

Amateur
Roy was selected in the third round, 44th overall, by the Quebec Major Junior Hockey League (QMJHL)'s Cape Breton Screaming Eagles in the 2007 QMJHL Entry Draft. In his first season with Cape Breton, Roy recorded four shutouts and ultimately won the RDS Cup as the League's top rookie.

Roy then played for Team Quebec in the 2008 ADT Canada-Russia Challenge, and was named Team Quebec's Player of the Game in their 5–3 win over Team Russia in the first game of the series.

Roy was ranked as the second-best North American goaltender available by the NHL Central Scouting Bureau going into the 2009 NHL Entry Draft in Montreal, and on June 27, he was selected by the Edmonton Oilers in the fifth round, 133rd overall.

Roy played for Canada at the 2011 World Junior Ice Hockey Championships, along with goaltender Mark Visentin, and started the opening game of the tournament against Russia.  After three seasons with Cape Breton, Roy was traded to the Acadie-Bathurst Titan for the 2010–11 season, but struggled during the playoffs. In 2012, his rights were traded to the Baie-Comeau Drakkar.

Professional
On March 30, 2011, Roy signed a three-year, entry-level contract with the Edmonton Oilers. On November 8, 2013, Roy was traded by the Oilers to the Calgary Flames along with Ladislav Šmíd in exchange for Roman Horák and Laurent Brossoit.

On September 30, 2014, as a free agent and without an NHL offer, Roy signed a one-year ECHL contract with the Idaho Steelheads.

As a free agent, Roy opted to pursue a European career, and signed a one-year deal with Slovenian club, HDD Olimpija Ljubljana, a member of the Austrian Hockey League (EBEL), on July 30, 2015. After one year with Olimpija, he headed to fellow EBEL team EC VSV.

After five seasons in Germany with Augsburger, Roy left as a free agent to sign a one-year deal with Hungarian club, Fehérvár AV19 of the ICEHL, on May 13, 2022.

Career statistics

Regular season and playoffs

International

Awards and honours

References

External links

1991 births
Living people
Abbotsford Heat players
Acadie–Bathurst Titan players
Alaska Aces (ECHL) players
Augsburger Panther players
Canadian ice hockey goaltenders
Cape Breton Screaming Eagles players
Barys Astana draft picks
Edmonton Oilers draft picks
ETC Crimmitschau players
Fehérvár AV19 players
Ice hockey people from Quebec
Idaho Steelheads (ECHL) players
Oklahoma City Barons players
HDD Olimpija Ljubljana players
People from Amqui
Springfield Falcons players
Stockton Thunder players
EC VSV players
Canadian expatriate ice hockey players in Austria
Canadian expatriate ice hockey players in Slovenia
Canadian expatriate ice hockey players in Germany